Llantilio Pertholey is a small village and community (parish) in Monmouthshire, south east Wales. The parish covers a large area beneath the Skirrid, an outlier of the Black Mountains; much of the parish lies within the easternmost part of the Brecon Beacons National Park.

Governance
The village falls in the 'Mardy' electoral ward. This ward stretches  to the east. The total population taken at the 2011 census was 1,469.

History and amenities 
The 13th century medieval Church of St Teilo is named after a 6th-century Bishop of Llandaff who was canonised for his good works.  The church is a fine example of a rural Welsh church with three chantry chapels dating from about 1350.

The hamlet also had a primary school, which moved to the nearby Mardy district of Abergavenny in 1991.  A popular pub, The Mitre, opposite the church closed some years ago.

References

External links 

 St. Teilo's Church website
 Llantilio Pertholey Primary School 
 Old photo of the church
 Recent photo of the church
 Kelly's Directory of Monmouthshire 1901
 

Villages in Monmouthshire
Communities in Monmouthshire